Wellington Wells (April 18, 1868 – April 23, 1954) was a Massachusetts lawyer and politician who served as President of the Massachusetts Senate from 1925 to 1928.

Wells was the Assistant Clerk Superior Civil Court of Boston from 1895 to 1901. Wells was a member of the Massachusetts House of Representatives in 1919. Wells was elected in 1920 to represent the fifth Suffolk Senatorial District of the Massachusetts Senate. Wells was elected Senate President in 1925 and remained President until his retirement in 1928.  Wells died on April 23, 1954, at Massachusetts General Hospital.

See also
Willard Homestead (Harrisville, New Hampshire), Wells' summer house
 1919 Massachusetts legislature
 1920 Massachusetts legislature
 1921–1922 Massachusetts legislature
 1923–1924 Massachusetts legislature
 1925–1926 Massachusetts legislature
 1927–1928 Massachusetts legislature

References

1868 births
Harvard College alumni
Harvard Law School alumni
Republican Party members of the Massachusetts House of Representatives
Republican Party Massachusetts state senators
Presidents of the Massachusetts Senate
Politicians from Boston
People from Arlington, Massachusetts
Massachusetts lawyers
1954 deaths
Lawyers from Boston
Cambridge Rindge and Latin School alumni